Move On is a 1917 American short comedy film featuring Harold Lloyd. A print survives in the Museum of Modern Art film archive.

Plot
Harold plays a policeman who gets into a series of misadventures while patrolling a park.  He runs afoul of his superior while attempting to woo the man's nanny while on duty.

Cast
 Harold Lloyd as Chester Fields
 Snub Pollard 
 Bebe Daniels 
 W.L. Adams
 William Blaisdell
 Sammy Brooks
 Marie Gilbert
 William Gillespie
 Max Hamburger
 Bud Jamison
 Oscar Larson
 Maynard Laswell (as M.A. Laswell)
 Gus Leonard
 Chris Lynton
 M.J. McCarthy
 Susan Miller
 Belle Mitchell
 Fred C. Newmeyer
 Charles Stevenson

See also
 Harold Lloyd filmography

References

External links

 Move On on YouTube

1917 films
1917 short films
American silent short films
1917 comedy films
American black-and-white films
Films directed by Gilbert Pratt
Silent American comedy films
American comedy short films
1910s American films